Green Bottles for Marjorie: The Lost BBC Sessions is a live album by the progressive rock group Caravan, offering several early BBC Radio broadcast.

Track listing 

"Green Bottles for Marjorie"
"Place of My Own"
"Ride"
"Feeling, Reeling & Squealing"
"In the Land of Grey & Pink"
"Nine Feet Underground"
"Feeling, Reeling & Squealing"
"Love in Your Eye"

 Tracks 1-4: Top Gear session – Recorded 31.12.1968
 Tracks 5-7: Radio One in Concert – Recorded and first broadcast 16.5.1971
 Track 8: John Peel session – Recorded 11.4.1972
 Remastered and compiled at The Audio Archiving Company, London

Personnel
 Pye Hastings – guitar, vocals
 David Sinclair – keyboards (tracks 1–7)
 Steve Miller – keyboards (track 8)
 Richard Sinclair – bass, vocals
 Richard Coughlan – drums

References

External links
 Caravan - Green Bottles for Marjorie: The Lost BBC Sessions album review by Lindsay Planer, credits & releases at AllMusic.com
 Caravan - Green Bottles for Marjorie: The Lost BBC Sessions album releases & credits at Discogs.com
 Caravan - Green Bottles for Marjorie: The Lost BBC Sessions album credits & user reviews at ProgArchives.com

Caravan (band) live albums
2002 live albums
BBC Radio recordings